East Hannibal is an unincorporated community in Pike County, in the U.S. state of Illinois. The community was named for its location east of Hannibal, Missouri.

References

Unincorporated communities in Pike County, Illinois
Unincorporated communities in Illinois